Dryopoa , or giant mountain grass, is a genus of Australian plants in the grass family.

The only known species is Dryopoa dives, native to New South Wales, Tasmania, and Victoria. The name Dryopoa (tree-grass) is derived from the Greek language, with dryos meaning tree and poa meaning grass.

References 

Pooideae
Monotypic Poaceae genera
Endemic flora of Australia
Poales of Australia
Taxa named by Ferdinand von Mueller